Lapidaria is an extinct genus of trilobites. It lived during the Arenig stage of the Ordovician Period, approximately 478 to 471 million years ago.

References

Ordovician trilobites
Fossils of Sweden
Asaphida genera
Asaphidae